MasterChef Italia is the Italian version of culinary talent show MasterChef. The first edition was aired from 21 September to 7 December 2011 on Sky Uno.

The judges are chefs Bruno Barbieri, Carlo Cracco, Antonino Cannavacciuolo by the fifth edition and restaurateur Joe Bastianich (judge of MasterChef U.S.).  Voiceovers are made by Simone D'Andrea and Luisa Ziliotto. Carlo Cracco quit the program after the end of 6th season and was replaced by Antonia Klugmann in the 7th. Antonia Klugmann was in turn replaced by Giorgio Locatelli for Season 8.

MasterChef Italia winners earn €100,000 in gold coins and get to publish a recipe book (published by RCS Rizzoli).

The success of the first edition included parodies of the program, including The Scoured, Crozza in Wonderland and Made in Sud with the parody Mastrochef

Format 
 Mystery Box Challenge: participants have to prepare a dish following the instructions of the judges and the ingredients contained in their Mystery Boxes. The judges taste the three most interesting dishes, and the winner is given an advantage for the next challenge.
 Invention Test: the participants have to re-create a dish decided by the judges or, often, by a guest (including renowned figures such as Marco Pierre White, Masaharu Morimoto and Matt Preston). The winner of the Mystery Box Challenge is given an advantage over the other participants, which could go as far as being exempted from the challenge. The duration of this test is variable, and here the judges, after tasting all dishes, nominate the winner of the test (who can choose their own team in the challenge in external as well as having other benefits) and the three cooks with the worst outcome, and between them at least one is eliminated (sometimes the others are sent directly to the Pressure Test).
 Team Challenge: in this test, the candidates are divided into two teams (or challenge each other) and have to prepare dishes to be served in a particular situation, usually outside MasterChef's kitchen, and for a considerable number of people, ranging from 100 to 10. MasterChef Italia has visited several locations in Italy and abroad, including Norwegian fjords, the Vatican, Naples. The winner of the invention test can choose the components of either teams and, at times, the courses to prepare, or have other particular advantages, such as advice from local chefs. The winning team will be voted upon by the guests they prepared food for, by simple majority. 
 Pressure Test: the members of the losing team will compete against each other in a task (or set of tasks), usually with a very strict time limit, until at least one of them is eliminated.
 The Final: in the Season Finale, the two (or three) remaining participants face each other in a 2-hour long duel, during which they have to serve their own degustation menu, composed of at least four courses.

Season One 
The first season of MasterChef Italy aired from 21 September to 7 December in 2011 on Sky and saw Spyros Theodoridis come out the winner. In addition, on 21 and 28 December, two special episodes were aired dedicated to the background and to the comments of the protagonists.

Contestants

Season Two 
In February 2012 Sky Italy opened up the casting for the second edition.

The winner of the second edition was attorney Tiziana Stefanelli. Unlike the previous edition, the first MasterChef aired on Sky One from 13 December 2012 to 21 February 2013. On days 19, 20 and 21 November 2012, three special introductory episodes had aired: Joe Bastianich: Family Affairs, Carlo Cracco:The Squaring Of The Egg and Bruno Barbieri: Chef 7-Star. In addition, the three judges were guests in an episode of X Factor Italy, of That Heavenly Goal! and The Barbarian Invasions.

Contestants

Season Three 
In February 2013 casting opened for the third edition. The race started 19 December 2013 and ended on 6 March 2014. The winner of the third edition was Francesco Federico Ferrero, a medical intern. Unlike the other two editions, the winner was announced live at the General Stores in Milan. The season will be broadcast again on Cielo, a DTV channel, in September 2014.

Contestants

Season Four 
In February 2014 casting opened for the fourth season scheduled for the second half of 2014 again on Sky Uno. Filming of these episodes will begin in June. MasterChef Italy started on 18 December 2014 and the winner was Stefano Callegaro. The winner's name was leaked by the media and published before the final episode of the season.

Contestants

Season Five 
In February 2015 casting opened for the fifth season started on December 18, 2015, on Sky Uno. By this season there was a new entry, Antonino Cannavacciuolo as a new judge. The Season Finale aired on March 3, 2016, and the winner was Erica Liverani.

Contestants

Season Six 
In February 2016 casting opened for the sixth season scheduled for the second half of 2016 on Sky Uno. The winner of this season was the youngest winner in MasterChef History, Valerio Braschi (18 years old).

Contestants

Season Seven 
In February 2017 casting opened for the seventh season scheduled for the end of the year. The 7th season started airing in December 2017 until April 2018. Carlo Cracco was replaced by the first woman judge, Antonia Klugmann. This edition was won by Simone Scipioni.

Contestants

Season Eight 
The 8th season of MasterChef started airing in December 2018 until April 2019. Antonia Klugmann left MasterChef after only one season, being replaced by chef Giorgio Locatelli. The winner was Valeria Raciti from Sicily. She then published the book Amore curiosità istinto. La mia cucina felice.

Contestants

Season Nine 
The 9th season of MasterChef started airing in December 2019. Joe Bastianich left MasterChef after eight seasons, Bruno Barbieri is now the only judge left from the original cast. Antonio Lorenzon is the winner of this season.

Contestants

Season Ten 
The 10th season of MasterChef started airing on December 17, 2020. The contestants include American journalist, Maxwell Alexander. The winner was Francesco Aquila.

Contestants

Season Eleven 
The 11th season of MasterChef started airing on December 16, 2021. The winner was Tracy Eboigbodin.

Contestants

Season Twelve 
The 12th season of MasterChef started airing on December 15, 2022.

Contestants

Spin-off Celebrity MasterChef Italia 
In 2017 the first season of Celebrity MasterChef Italia ended with the victory of Roberta Capua, an Italian TV host.

Contestants

Spin-off Celebrity MasterChef Italia 2 
In 2018 the second season of Celebrity MasterChef Italia ended with the victory of Anna Tatangelo, an Italian singer.

Contestants

Spin-off Junior MasterChef Italia 
On 16 April 2013 it was announced the MasterChef inspired spin-off, MasterChef Italy Junior, would involve children between 8 and 13 years of age. The casting began on 17 April 2013. The judges are Bruno Barbieri, Lidia Bastianich and Alessandro Borghese. The first season aired from 13 March to 10 April 2014. After three seasons, the spin-off was put on hiatus.

Spin-off Masterchef All Stars

Note

External links 
 Official Website of MasterChef Italy
 Official MasterChef Italy on Facebook
 Official Account of MasterChef Italy on Twitter
 Official Account of MasterChef Italy on Instagram
 

2011 Italian television series debuts
Italy
Italian reality television series
Italian television series based on British television series
Sky Uno original programming
Cielo (TV channel) original programming